Montenegrins in Bosnia and Herzegovina may refer to:

 Montenegrins of Bosnia and Herzegovina, an ethnic minority in Bosnia and Herzegovina
 Citizens of Montenegro, living or working in Bosnia and Herzegovina

See also
 Montenegrins (disambiguation)
 Montenegro (disambiguation)
 Bosnia and Herzegovina
 Montenegrins in Croatia (disambiguation)
 Montenegrins in Serbia (disambiguation)